Jango may refer to:

Jango (novel), a 2006 book by William Nicholson
Jango (TV series), a 1961 British TV show
Jango (website) a free Internet radio service with no commercials
Jango, Pakistan, a village in Pakistan
Jango Edwards (born 1950), American clown
Jango Fett, a character from Star Wars
João Goulart (1918–1976), Brazilian politician nicknamed "Jango"
Jango (1984 film), a Brazilian documentary about Goulart
Jango (2021 film), a Tamil science fiction film
Jango, a character in the Powerman (Powerbolt) comic series

See also
 Django (disambiguation)